David Charles Gompert (born October 6, 1945) is an American government official and former diplomat who served as the acting Director of National Intelligence (DNI) following the resignation of Dennis C. Blair in 2009. Prior to his ascension as DNI, he was Principal Deputy Director of National Intelligence and continued serving in that capacity until 2011.

In between government and academic tenures, Gompert has worked in the private sector. He has worked in senior executive positions at Unisys, AT&T, and most recently as a senior fellow at RAND, a leading research organization that explores topics such as national security, terrorism, economic development, and science and technology. Before that, he was a distinguished research professor at the National Defense University's Center for Technology and National Security Policy.

From 2003 to 2004, Gompert was the senior adviser for national security and defense to the Coalition Provisional Authority in Iraq that followed the ousted Ba'athist regime.

From 1975 to 1983, he held numerous positions at the U.S. Department of State, serving as deputy to the Under Secretary of State for Political Affairs, deputy director of the Bureau of Political-Military Affairs, and special assistant to former Secretary of State Henry Kissinger. Following these capacities in the Ford, Carter, and Reagan administrations, he was appointed Special Assistant to President George H. W. Bush.

Gompert received a bachelor's degree in engineering from the U.S. Naval Academy, where he once served on the faculty, and a Master of Public Affairs from Princeton University's Woodrow Wilson School of Public and International Affairs.

Notes

External links

 
 Press Release on United States Senate Confirmation
 Clean, Lean, and Able: A Strategy for Defense Development By David C. Gompert, Olga Oliker, and Anga Timilsina, The RAND Corporation, January 2004.
 Occupying Iraq: A History of the Coalition Provisional Authority The RAND Corporation, 2009. By James Dobbins, Seth G. Jones, Benjamin Runkle, Sidd harth Mohandas.

|-

1945 births
Living people
RAND Corporation people
United States Deputy Directors of National Intelligence
United States Naval Academy alumni
United States Naval Academy faculty
Princeton School of Public and International Affairs alumni